José Jaime Maussan Flota (born May 31, 1953) is a Mexican journalist, television personality and ufologist.

Career 
Jaime Maussan studied journalism at UNAM and Miami University in Ohio, United States.

Since 1970 he has been a reporter at various newspapers and broadcasting outlets, among them El Sol de México, XEX Radio and with Televisa, he worked at  24 Horas newscast. With Televisa he was a correspondent at the United States and a general assignment reporter for the Domingo a Domingo (Sunday to Sunday) program hosted by Jacobo Zabludovsky. He also produced stories for the Sunday show.

In June 1990 he received a Global 500 award from Mostafa Kamal Tolba, Executive Director of the United Nations Environment Programme (UNEP).

In 1991 Jaime Maussan broke records at Mexican Television next to Nino Canún and his program Y usted que opina? (So what's your opinion?), since they transmitted for over 11 hours and a half on the subject of UFOs.

In June 2017, Maussan was involved in the analysis of 5 mummies discovered in Peru at the region where the UNESCO World Heritage Nazca Lines site is located. The images of these findings were initially aired in a documentary sponsored by Gaia, Inc. and it allegedly shows a crouched mummified body of a humanoid figure with an elongated skull and three fingers on each hand and foot.) Snopes reported that Maussan "led an event called Be Witness, at which a mummified body — purportedly that of an alien — was unveiled. Later, though, that 'alien' discovery was debunked. The mummified corpse was shown to be that of a human child.".

Education 

 National Autonomous University of Mexico (1972–73)
 Graduated from Miami University with a B.A. in Radio and Television (1974–1976).

References

External links
 Jaime Maussan - Homepage
 Jaime Maussan - Homepage - Biography
 Jaime Maussan - The Essence

1953 births
Living people
National Autonomous University of Mexico alumni
Mexican journalists
Male journalists
Ufologists
UFO writers
Miami University alumni
Place of birth missing (living people)
Coast to Coast AM